The 11th Moscow International Film Festival was held from 14 to 28 August 1979. The Golden Prizes were awarded to the Italian-French film Christ Stopped at Eboli directed by Francesco Rosi, the Spanish film Siete días de enero directed by Juan Antonio Bardem and the Polish film Camera Buff directed by Krzysztof Kieślowski.

Jury
 Stanislav Rostotsky (USSR - President of the Jury)
 Vladimir Baskakov (USSR)
 Otakar Vávra (Czechoslovakia)
 Giuseppe De Santis (Italy)
 Jerzy Kawalerowicz (Poland)
 Raj Kapoor (India)
 Christian-Jaque (France)
 Tom Luddy (USA)
 Margarita Lopez Portillo (Mexico)
 Kurt Maetzig (East Germany)
 Andrei Mikhalkov-Konchalovsky (USSR)
 Tabata Ndiaye (Senegal)
 Emil Petrov (Bulgaria)
 Konstantin Stepankov (USSR)
 Tran Vu (Vietnam)

Films in competition
The following films were selected for the main competition:

Awards
 Golden Prizes:
 Christ Stopped at Eboli by Francesco Rosi
 Siete días de enero by Juan Antonio Bardem 
 Camera Buff by Krzysztof Kieślowski
 Honorable Golden Prize: ¡Que viva México! by Sergei Eisenstein
 Silver Prizes:
 The Barrier by Christo Christov
 Parashuram by Mrinal Sen
 Takeoff by Savva Kulish
 Prizes:
 Best Actor: Ulrich Thein for Anton the Magician
 Best Actor: Bata Živojinović for Moment
 Best Actress: Yasmina Khlat for Nahla
 Best Actress: Daisy Granados for Portrait of Teresa
 Special Diploma: Only Ahead by Long Van
 Prix FIPRESCI: Camera Buff by Krzysztof Kieślowski
 Honorable Prizes (for the contribution to the cinema):
 Antonin Brousil
 Luis Buñuel
 King Vidor
 Cesare Zavattini
 Zoltán Fábri
 Jerzy Kawalerowicz
 René Clair
 Akira Kurosawa
 Satyajit Ray
 Ousmane Sembène
 Andrew Thorndike
 Annelie Thorndike

References

External links
Moscow International Film Festival: 1979 at Internet Movie Database

1979
1979 film festivals
1979 in the Soviet Union
1979 in Moscow
August 1979 events in Europe